Kirtankhola FC is a Bangladeshi football club based in Barisal. It currently competes in the North Bengal International Gold Cup is an international club football tournament.

History
Kirtankhola FC club from Barisal which was established on 28 August 2010. They are competes in the inaugural edition of North Bengal International Gold Cup an international football tournament and several district as well as divisional football leagues.

Current squad
The club management have not yet announced the squad for upcoming season.

NBGC performance by year

Top goalscorers by season

Head coach records

Club management

Current technical staff
As of 20 October 2022

References

Football clubs in Bangladesh
Sport in Barisal